Renovate Switzerland is a Swiss civil resistance campaign launched in April 2022 which uses non-violent actions as a means to pressure the Swiss Federal Council to implement a national plan to insulate one million homes by 2040, in order to address the issues of climate change and the energy crisis.  It is part of an international network of civil resistance campaigns, with similar actions taking place in Germany, Australia, Canada, France, Italy, Norway, the United Kingdom and the United States. These different campaigns share similar tactics, but focus on demands that are specific to their national context. Several of them do however focus on the issue of the energy consumption of buildings.

Renovate Switzerland had initially sent a letter exposing their demands to the President of the Swiss Confederation Simonetta Sommaruga, however the response  they received fell short of their expectations. After four roadblocks in April 2022, the campaign entered a new action phase in October 2022.  Co-Author of the UN  IPCC report Julia Steinberger participated to a roadblock  in Bern on October 11th, and glued her hand to the asphalt alongside five other people. 

Most of Renovate Switzerland's actions involve roadblocks of major Swiss motorways and roads. While their actions are generally considered  illegal, they are supported by some politicians such as  Swiss Green Party Léonore Porchet,  who views civil disobedience to be legitimate given the urgency of the climate crisis. According to a survey commissioned by Renovate Switzerland, 61% of Swiss people believe that the renovation of buildings to save energy should be a key priority of the Federal Council.

Controversies 
The logo of Renovate Switzerland is suspected to infringe on the Rivella drink  logo trademark, and the company said they are considering legal action.

References 

Climate change organizations
Climate change protests
Radical environmentalism
Direct action
Environmental organisations based in Switzerland
Political organisations based in Switzerland